Max Willman (born February 13, 1995) is an American professional ice hockey forward currently playing for the Lehigh Valley Phantoms in the American Hockey League (AHL) as a prospect to the Philadelphia Flyers of the National Hockey League (NHL). The Buffalo Sabres selected Willman in the fifth round 121st overall, of the 2014 NHL Entry Draft.

Early life 
Willman was born on February 13, 1995, in Barnstable, Massachusetts, to Peyton and Timothy Willman. He began ice skating at the age of three, playing for minor ice hockey teams in Barnstable and Foxborough, Massachusetts before joining the varsity team at Barnstable High School. There, he had six total postseason appearances between ice hockey and lacrosse, led the hockey team in scoring for two seasons and served as captain during the 2012–13 season. Barnstable won 52 regular season games with Willman on their roster and took home three consecutive Old Colony League championship titles. When Willman received no NCAA Division I scholarship offers to play college ice hockey, Willman planned on abandoning hockey and attending Quinnipiac University as a non-athlete. He reconsidered after being noticed by the head coach of the ice hockey team at Williston Northampton School, a private college-preparatory school that participated in a number of hockey tournaments and showcases. He spent a postgraduate year there, serving as captain and as top-line center while leading the team with 21 goals and 44 points.

Playing career

Amateur 
The Buffalo Sabres of the National Hockey League (NHL) selected Willman in the fifth round, 121st overall, of the 2014 NHL Entry Draft. At the time, he had already committed to playing college hockey with the Brown University Bears. He scored his first NCAA goal in his first game, scoring in a 4–2 win over the Army Black Knights.

After setting career highs during the 2016–17 season with 11 goals and 26 points in 31 games, Willman only played nine games during his senior season in 2017–18, missing the final 21 after suffering a knee injury. The injury gave Willman an additional season of NCAA eligibility, and so he enrolled in a graduate program at Boston University in order to play a year with the Terriers.

Professional 
The Sabres opted not to sign Willman after his year at Boston University, and so he accepted an offer from the Reading Royals of the ECHL, a minor league affiliate of the Philadelphia Flyers. By the end of the 2019–20 season, he had moved up to the Lehigh Valley Phantoms of the American Hockey League (AHL), the top minor league in the NHL system. Willman made his NHL debut in the Flyers' 2021–22 home opener against the Vancouver Canucks, filling in for a roster that had been thinned out by travel protocols and injury. Willman scored his first NHL goal on December 10, 2021, in the second period of Philadelphia's 4–3 victory over the Vegas Golden Knights.

Career statistics

References

External links 
 

1995 births
Living people
American ice hockey forwards
People from Barnstable, Massachusetts
Boston University Terriers men's ice hockey players
Brown Bears men's ice hockey players
Buffalo Sabres draft picks
Lehigh Valley Phantoms players
Ice hockey players from Massachusetts
Reading Royals players
Philadelphia Flyers players